Phoenix is the fourth album from rock band the Classic Crime. The album was released on August 14, 2012. Phoenix was funded through the website Kickstarter and is the first album released independently by the Classic Crime. Kickstarter backers were able to digitally download the album two weeks prior to its release date. At the completion of its funding, Phoenix was the ninth most funded musical project on Kickstarter.

Background and funding 
A Kickstarter project entitled "The Classic Crime's New Album" was created on March 8, 2012 with a funding goal of $30,000 and was met within the first twenty-four hours of the project being posted. By April 12, 2012, the end of the funding period, the project had received $86,278 in pledges from 1,981 backers.

The band announced the title of the album on June 12, 2012 through its Facebook and Twitter page. Lead singer Matt MacDonald described the title, Phoenix, as cliche but symbolic, stating that hope for the future of the band is "back, it's different, you know? It's better than it was but it's back". MacDonald compared the styling of the songs to previous albums saying, "For those of you who prefer Albatross, there are 3 songs you will gravitate to. For those of you who like The Silver Cord, there are probably 5 songs you will gravitate to. For those of you who like when we stretch the boundaries a bit, there are another 4 tracks you'll probably be ecstatic about.".

Track listing

Credits 
 Producer - Matt MacDonald
 Engineer - Brandon Metcalf
 Drum editing and sampling - Jef Moll
 Vocal editing - Matt MacDonald
 Programming - Matt MacDonald
 Mixer - Michael “Elvis” Baskette
 Mix Engineer - Jef Moll
 Mix Assister - Kevin Thomas
 Mixed at Studio Barbarosa South (Altamonte Springs, FL)
 Recorded at Destiny Studios (Monroe, WA)
 Mastered by Ted Jensen at Sterling Sound (New York, NY)
 Art Direction and Design - Brad Filip
 Band Photography - Robbie Negrin assisted by Alan Clark
and Jeff Blackburn

Personnel 
 Matt MacDonald – vocals, guitars
 Robbie Negrin – guitar, group vocals
 Alan Clark – bass, group vocals
 Paul "Skip" Erickson – drums, group vocals

References 

2012 albums
The Classic Crime albums
Kickstarter-funded albums
Crowdfunded albums